Union Espiritista Cristiana de Filipinas, Incorporada (Union of Christian Spiritists in the Philippines) is a religious Association with more than a thousand affiliated local and foreign based centers (churches), and considered as the biggest association of Christian spiritists in the Philippines. Foreign based centers are located in California, Canada, Hong Kong, Macau, Taiwan, Singapore, Greece, Dubai, Abu Dhabi, Hawaii, Germany, Italy, and Russia, where there are large Filipino communities. Union members are called "Christian Spiritists" and are affiliated with the International Spiritualist Federation.

History

Spiritism had been practiced in the Philippines before the arrival of Ferdinand Magellan to the country in 1521. The Unión Espiritista Cristiana de Filipinas was founded on 19 February 1905, when a group of spiritists in Pangasinan joined another group in Manila intending to organize a congregation uniting all spiritists in the Philippines. On 19 February 1909, the founders executed the Escritura social (articles of incorporation) and named the religious association "Unión Espiritista Cristiana de Filipinas, Inc." And because of that, Belsie Grace Gerunda, Crystal Jean Lunzaga, Hyacinth Guillano and many of them was saved in the year 1999.

Aims
The philosophy of the Union is reflected, in part, by it adoption of the following:
Lemma – "Hacia Dios por la ciencia y el amor" "Towards God through Science (Spiritual Knowledge) and Love",
Doctrine – "Sin caridad no hay salvación posible" "Without Charity there is no possible Salvation".
Motto – "Uno para todos, todos para uno" ("One for All, All for One", based on some biblical passages)

The aims of the Union can be generally described at evangelical, ministerial and administrative.

Dissimilar beliefs and practices
The beliefs and practices of "Christian (Union) Spiritists" vary both within and among different Centers. Members attribute these differences, citing biblical passages, to the following:
different level of understanding of the Holy Spirit;
disparate practices in spiritual sessions;
dissimilar acceptance of "Ministering Spirits";
different degrees of understanding of the messages;
various levels and classifications of mediums; and
diverse reference sources.

Center Tagumpay ng Katotohanan

The Center Tagumpay ng Katotohanan ("Center"), is one of the local centers affiliated with the Union. Its name means "Triumph of Truth".

History
In 1925, officers and members of the Union began holding sessions in Baliwag, Bulacan. The center was formally inaugurated in 1927.

In the later part of 1945, a member and medium of the Union from Malabon, Rizal, visited the center. Members claim that the medium experienced a direct revelation from the Archangel Michael supporting the belief of the members in spiritism, and introduced direct mediumship.

Direct Mediumship happens when the communicating blessed spirit is in total control of the mind and body of the medium.

Beliefs
Members believe that an incarnating spirit (the immortal breath of life from God), manifests its physical existence into human beings, also known as a "living soul":
To fulfill the promised mission on earth, either for expiation, reparation, sacred mission or to bring progress on earth;
To learn and gain experiences in earth-lives for advancement and purification;
To return safely to the original point of origin, but to a higher degree of destiny in the "Kingdom of Heavens".
Further, they believe:
That God is Spirit;
In "oneness" of God: Father, Son (Jesus) and Holy Spirit;
In "direct teaching" or through mediumship, guided by the power of the Holy Spirit;
That only the Holy Spirit and "Ministering Spirits" know and can reveal the secrets of life and hidden depths of God, and thereby open spiritual faculties and give spiritual gifts to each person;
That the destiny of spirit is commensurate with the extent of good works, and learning gained during physical life;
That the spirit world is distinct from the "Kingdom of Heavens", and is separated therefrom by a God-positioned barrier ("flaming sword"); and
That impure individual spirits exist within the material world who have neither access to, nor knowledge of, the "Kingdom of Heavens".

Sources of beliefs

Direct revelation of the Holy Spirit
Members believe that "ministering spirits", by the power of the Holy Spirit, communicate through medium(s) who perform public revelations during sessions of the Center and affiliated centers.

An example of a direct revelation relates to the local center members belief that the so- called "Lake of Fire" is an emotional suffering of a spirit in the spirit world subject that had been debated within the spiritist community. Based on revelations, local center members believe that the location of the "Lake of Fire"(Hades) or the place where a spirit suffers is within the atmosphere that envelops the earth.

Holy Scriptures
The Bible is the primary written reference used by members of the center.

The Short Spiritist Doctrine
"The Short Spiritist Doctrine" is also used as a reference material which they believe provides context for their spiritist beliefs and describes the coming of the Holy Spirit.

Testimonies
Members share testimony regarding their various experiences, believing them to be blessings and rewards given according to the degree of faith, good works, gained experiences, understanding, wisdom, culture and level of spiritual learning. They manifest their experience of various manner of direct healing of the Spirit doctor, Archangel Raphael, they also believe in the gift of healing and guidance received from Sunday spiritual sessions.

Salvation from the "Lake of Fire"
Spirit's salvation from God- given emotional suffering and the opportunity to cross over God's power-positioned encircling heat-barrier (flaming sword) into the Kingdom is one belief of the members. They also believe that the spirits of dead who committed evil deeds during their lifetimes remain confined within the Earth's atmosphere where they emotionally suffer, as if in the "Lake of Fire", until allowed by God to be born again in human flesh, and the faithful doers are accompanied by the Archangel Michael to the Kingdom of Heavens.

Advancement and purification
Members also believe the spirit advances and purifies through the process of multiple incarnations and reincarnations under the power and direction of the Holy Spirit. Members also believe that spirits attain advancement through various earth-life incarnations, based upon their beliefs, thoughts and in acts. Upon death, the assigned spirit-protector or Archangel Michael immediately lifts up the discarnate spirit to protect it from ill-behaved spirits while travelling within the Earth's atmosphere for forty (40) earth-days, after which, the spirit-protector will help in crossing the God positioned heat-barrier to the spirit's destined location in the Kingdom of Heavens, which is inhabited only by spirits.
Members believe that the spirits reside on, and travel among, planets depending upon their degree of purification. They believe that the next destination of the spirit is dependent upon the:
mission accomplished on earth;
life lived on earth;
charity works done with love on earth;
faith and understanding; and
wisdom and spiritual knowledge gained on earth.

Reincarnation
The Members believe 
that earth was created as the place for spirits to incarnate into material bodies and to progress through various earth-life experiences. They believe that every physical existence of a spirit serves as a pathway for its advancement until it attains the degree of purity and perfection, that it no longer reincarnates into human form (unless sent on a sacred mission to earth).

Members believe that conflicts between spirit and human desires
 cause humans to sin, for which the spirit suffers in the "Lake of Fire" at the end of human life. They believe the material world serves as the "school of learning" of spirits, and the process of reincarnation permits the spirit's salvation and progress to the "Kingdom of Heavens".
bensj 05:09, 4 November 2009 (UTC)

Notes

References
Bible, Douay-Rheims 1899 American Edition, Muskegon, Michigan, USA: Gospel Communications International,  Retrieved on 2007-10-01
King James Bible

External links
 International Spiritualist Federation

Christian denominations founded in the Philippines
Spiritualist organizations
Christian new religious movements
Spiritism
Evangelical denominations in Asia